Every Man for Himself is the third studio album by American rock band Hoobastank, released on May 8, 2006, by Island Records. It was the first album not to feature bassist Markku Lappalainen after his departure in 2005; Jane's Addiction bassist Chris Chaney and Paul Bushnell took his place for the album.

Singles
The first single "If I Were You" was released on May 1, 2006

The second and third singles from Every Man for Himself were "Inside of You" and "Born to Lead" respectively.

Those who pre-ordered the album from Apple's iTunes Music Store, received a bonus track called "Face the Music." Those who purchased the album in Japan received two bonus tracks with their green limited edition CDs titled "Finally Awake" and "Waiting".  They also received a DVD with bonus content.

Promotion
Hoobastank announced the "Every Fan for Himself" tour which was billed as a fan appreciation tour, and to help promote the new album.

The song "Without a Fight" was featured in the trailer for the film Stormbreaker.   An abridged cover version of the song was composed for the penultimate mission of the Nintendo DS rhythm game Elite Beat Agents in which the titular protagonists first respond to an incursion from hostile alien invaders who outlaw all music.

Critical reception
Every Man for Himself was met with "mixed or average" reviews from critics. At Metacritic, which assigns a weighted average rating out of 100 to reviews from mainstream publications, this release received an average score of 53 based on 7 reviews.

In a review for AllMusic, critic reviewer Stephen Thomas Erlewine wrote: "If Every Man for Himself was constructed with the mainstream in mind, it likely won't win any new converts, since at their core Hoobastank remains unchanged: their songs aren't particularly dynamic or catchy, the band doggedly follows alt-rock conventions as if adherence to clichés gives the group legitimacy, and Robb's pedestrian voice alternately disappears into the mix or veers flat when he holds a note."

Track listing
All tracks composed by Daniel Estrin and Doug Robb.

Personnel
Hoobastank
 Doug Robb – lead vocals, rhythm guitar, bass (Tracks unknown)
 Daniel Estrin – lead guitar, bass (Tracks unknown)
 Chris Hesse – drums, percussion

Additional personnel
 Dale Dye – drill sergeant on "The Rules" and "Born to Lead"
 Chris Chaney – bass (tracks 3, 5, 9, 10)
 Paul Bushnell – bass (tracks 2, 4, 6-8, 11-13)
 Howard Benson – keyboard, programming
 Lenny Castro – percussion
 Deborah Lurie – string arrangements
 Casey Stone – strings
 The Heart Attack Horns – horns on "Inside of You" and "More Than a Memory"
 Frank Marocco – accordion on "More Than a Memory"

Charts

Certifications

References

External links

Hoobastank albums
2006 albums
Albums produced by Howard Benson